is a retired Japanese male volleyball player. He was part of the Japan men's national volleyball team. On club level, he only played for JT Thunders.

References

External links
 profile at FIVB.org

1985 births
Living people
Japanese men's volleyball players
People from Nagasaki
Sportspeople from Nagasaki Prefecture
21st-century Japanese people